If I Go may refer to:

 "If I Go" (Anouk song), 2008
 "If I Go" (Ella Eyre song), 2014
 "If I Go", song by Colin Hay from album Transcendental Highway